Bakubang Island is an island located near Lahad Datu in Sabah, Malaysia.

See also
 List of islands of Malaysia

External links 
 Pulau Bakubang on geoview.info
 Pulau Bakubang on MyFishMaps.com

Islands of Sabah